Pen-Lon is a village in the community of Rhosyr, Ynys Môn, Wales, located just south east of the larger village of Newborough. Attractions in the locality include the island's model village (miniature park) 

The nearest railway station is Bodorgan, five miles away and the 42 bus from Llangefni to Bangor runs through the village.

References

See also 
 List of localities in Wales by population

Villages in Anglesey